Bassel al-Assad Stadium is a multi-purpose stadium in Al-Hasakah. It is currently used mostly for football matches. The stadium has a capacity of 25,000 spectators.

See also
List of stadiums

Football venues in Syria
Multi-purpose stadiums in Syria